The following are the national records in track cycling in South Korea maintained by the Korea Cycling Federation.

Men

Women

References
General
South Korean records 26 June 2022 updated
Specific

External links
Korea Cycling Federation

South Korea
Records
Track cycling
track cycling